HD 101930, also known as Gliese 3683, is an orange hued star located in the southern constellation Centaurus. It has an apparent magnitude of 8.21, making it faintly visible in binoculars but not to the naked eye.

Characteristics
HD 101930 has a stellar classification of K2 V+, indicating that it is an ordinary K-type main-sequence star. When combined, these parameters yield a luminosity 43% that of the Sun from its photosphere. As expected with planetary hosts, HD 101930 is metal enriched, having a metallicity 26% above solar levels.

Planetary system
In 2005, the discovery of a planet orbiting the star was announced. This is another discovery using the radial velocity method with the HARPS spectrograph.

See also 
 HD 93083
 HD 102117
 List of extrasolar planets
 HARPS spectrograph

References

External links 
 

K-type main-sequence stars
101930
057172
Centaurus (constellation)
Planetary systems with one confirmed planet
3683
BD-57 4096